Song Dan, may refer to:

 Song Dan (javelin thrower), Chinese javelin thrower
 Song Dan (general), Chinese general